This is a list of yearly Minnesota Intercollegiate Athletic Conference football standings.

Minnesota Intercollegiate Athletic Conference football standings

References

Standings